Dawson Park is a park in north Portland, Oregon, in the United States. The 2.05-acre park, located at Stanton Street and North Williams Avenue, was acquired by Portland Parks & Recreation in 1921.

History

In November 2013, a $2.6 million renovation began, resulting in the park's closure for nearly a year. City officials, aware of gentrification of the surrounding neighborhood, used community input to avoid ruining the park's role as a gathering place favored by African Americans. The upgraded park now includes a new playground and interactive water feature, enhanced accessibility and lighting, and new barbecue and picnic areas. Dawson Park also features double-sided medallions designed by Isaka Shamsud-Din, with traditional African patterns on one side and depictions of the neighborhood on the opposite side.

See also

 List of parks in Portland, Oregon

References

External links
 

1921 establishments in Oregon
Eliot, Portland, Oregon
North Portland, Oregon
Parks in Portland, Oregon
Protected areas established in 1921